The Kerala State Film Award for Best Lyricist is an honour, begun in 1969, presented annually at the Kerala State Film Awards of India to a lyricist for best lyrics in a Malayalam film. Until 1997, the awards were managed directly by the Department of Information and Public Relations of the Government of Kerala. Since 1998, the awards have been constituted by the Kerala State Chalachitra Academy, an autonomous, non-profit institution functioning under the Department of Cultural Affairs (Kerala). The awardees are decided by an independent jury constituted every year by the government. They are announced by the Minister for Cultural Affairs and are presented by the Chief Minister.The first Kerala State film Awards ceremony was held in 1970 with Vayalar Ramavarma receiving the award for Nadhi and Kadalpalam (1969). O. N. V. Kurup is the most honoured lyricist with 14 awards, followed by  Gireesh Puthenchery with seven.

Most awards

The Kerala State Film Award for Best Lyricist winners

References
Official website
PRD, Govt. of Kerala: Awardees List

Kerala State Film Awards